Sidney Williams (born 1962) is an American author of six novels under his own name and three young adult novels under the pseudonym Michael August. He has also authored numerous short stories and comic book scripts. Williams received a Master of Fine Arts from Goddard College.

Biography
Williams grew up and worked as a newspaper reporter in Louisiana where much of his fiction is set. One of his most popular books, Night Brothers, brought a vampire to the Louisiana landscape.  He also co-authored the short story "Does the Blood Line Run on Time?" for the collection Under the Fang with fellow Louisiana writer Robert Petitt.

Williams now resides in Florida.:

Bibliography
Azarius
Night Brothers
Blood Hunter
Gnelfs
When Darkness Falls
Midnight Eyes

Short Stories
Give it to Me Baby (Hot Blood: Deadly After Dark)
Does the Blood Line Run on Time? (Under the Fang)
Lucius (Chapbook)
The Exclusive (Cemetery Dance)
Lucifer's Lair
Skull Rainbow with Wayne Allen Sallee (Great Britain only)
 Miss Daisy and the Rosary Pea (Crafty Cat Crimes)
The Handbook (Plots With Guns)
Scars (Blue Murder)
Repast (Erotic New Orleans Stories)
Lync (Werewolf Magazine Issue 7)
Telephone (Soul's Road)
Sleepers (Serialized, Paper Tape Magazine)

Comics
The Mantus Files (Malibu Graphics)
Sirens (Caliber)
The Scary Book (Caliber and Silverline)
The Dusk Society (Campfire, creator, concept and characters only)

As Michael August
Deadly Delivery
New Year's Evil
The Gift

References

External links

Website for Sidney Williams
Blog for Sidney Williams

Writers from Louisiana
Living people
1962 births
Goddard College alumni